The 2015 North Lincolnshire Council election took place on 7 May 2015 to elect members of the North Lincolnshire Council in England. It was held on the same day as other local elections.

The election resulted in the Conservative Party retaining control of the council.

References

2015 English local elections
May 2015 events in the United Kingdom
2015
2010s in Lincolnshire